Escape from the Bronx, also known as Bronx Warriors 2 in the United Kingdom and Escape 2000, is a 1983 Italian action film directed by Enzo G. Castellari. It was featured on Mystery Science Theater 3000 under its Escape 2000 name. It is a sequel to 1990: The Bronx Warriors.

Plot
Several years after the events of 1990: The Bronx Warriors, Trash (Mark Gregory), former leader of the Riders gang is now a cynical loner, remaining in the impoverished, lawless wasteland of the Bronx and trading in stolen ammunition.

The General Construction (GC) Corporation, led by President Clarke (Enio Girolami), wish to tear down the Bronx to turn it into “the city of the future”. To do this they need to clear the current population from the area and have employed expelled prison warden Floyd Wangler (Henry Silva) and a private battalion of Disinfestors to burn, shoot and gas those that will not leave willingly.

While the bums, vagrants and elderly are easy prey, the remains of the warrior gangs of the Bronx will not go quietly and a rebel army of all surviving Bronx gangs led by Doblòn (Antonio Sabàto) is holed up underground.

When Trash's parents are burned alive by Disinfestors, he begins to take revenge by leading ruthless guerrilla attacks on the clean up squads which in turn leads to the GC Corporation and Floyd Wangler trying ever nastier means of subverting the rebellion (such as rigging hostages with bombs). 
Then Wangler calls all the squads' leaders and addresses them to a main order: find and kill Trash because the remains of the underground gangs could recognize him as a new charismatic leader for his courage and his ability.
Trash, Doblòn, and a crusading reporter named Moon Gray (Valerie Dobson) then team up with psychotic mercenary Crazy Strike (Timothy Brent/Giancarlo Prete) and his equally crazy son (Alessandro Prete) to try a surprise action: the kidnap of President Clarke as a move to put the Bronx back in the hands of the gangs.

Then Strike, Trash, Moon, and little Junior (Strike's son) move to the surface in order to carry out the kidnapping of Mr Clarke, who's about to attend a propaganda ceremony in the Bronx. As the older three go up, Junior remains downstairs to cover their subsequent escape with explosives. When upstairs, the three realize that the area is controlled by a security force. Moon stages a diversion: she suddenly appears during the governor's speech shouting against Clarke and the governor himself and accusing them of lying. Then one of the governor's men kills Moon and puts a gun on her in order to stage a "self-defense" action.

Chaos and confusion cross the area. President Clark uses an old wooden door as a shelter but, behind the door, stands Trash. He takes advantage of the confusion to force Clarke to accompany him while Crazy Strike helps by using explosives and hand-bombs. So Trash, Clark and Strike go back to a collector that gives them the passage into the underground area; their escape is smartly helped by the explosives set by Junior.

They get to Doblòn ruled area in order to carry out the blackmail but Mr Hoffman (Clark's deputy) orders Wangler to carry out an attack with a lethal gas; he wants to accomplish double missions: annihilating the résistance and eliminating president Clarke.

Doblòn gets a warning about the imminent attack and orders his people to move to the surface, so they succeed in avoiding the gas. When on the surface, the Bronx becomes a fierce battlefield; the two armies are engaged in a cruel combat.

At the end of those few hours of war; only three people survive: Trash, Crazy Strike, and Junior. After taking a look around him, the kid asks his father to go back to the underground because the surface wasteland is not a good place to be. Strike concurs and both father and son invite Trash to follow them. Trash doesn't accept and, after greeting those two friends, leaves.

Cast
Mark Gregory as Trash
Henry Silva as Floyd Wangler
Valeria D'Obici (as Valerie Dobson) as Moon Gray 
Giancarlo Prete (as Timothy Brent) as Strike
Antonio Sabato as Doblòn
Enio Girolami (as Thomas Moore) as President Clark 
Paolo Malco as Vice President
Eva Czemerys as Trash's Mother 
Alessandro Prete as Strike Jr
Moana Pozzi as Birdy
Carla Brait as Iron Man Leader
Massimo Vanni as Big Little Man
Enzo G. Castellari as Radio Operator with Mustache

Production 
Shot roughly 18 months after the first Bronx movie, Enzo G. Castellari has stated that he was disappointed with how much muscle mass Mark Gregory had lost between part one and this sequel, which is why he keeps his jacket on for 90% of the movie.

Filmed in New York and Cinecittà Film Studios in Rome. Mark Gregory was still 18 when he shot this movie and Enzo Castellari states on the DVD commentary for 1990: The Bronx Warriors that his young age and lack of experience was possibly a factor in why Mark did not last long in the film business.

Release
It was released theatrically by Fulvia Film in Italy on August 25, 1983, and in the United Kingdom on September 2, 1983.
The sequel film was released in US theaters on 18 January 1985 distributed by New Line Cinema.

Home media
The film was released on VHS in 1985 by Media Home Entertainment. Specific scenes were cut out of this release for unknown reasons. The film was later re-released on VHS in 1997 by New Line Home Video.

It was released on DVD in the UK by Vipco in 2003. Australian company Stomp Entertainment released a region 0 / NTSC disc in 2006. So far this is the only option for American fans to purchase as the DVD has never been official released on DVD in the United States.

Shameless Entertainment released the film on Region 2 / PAL format in the UK in 2009. The movie is part of a box set entitled "The Bronx Warriors Trilogy" and is packaged with 1990: The Bronx Warriors and The New Barbarians.

Blue Underground released the film in Blu-ray/DVD combo pack on June 30, 2015.

Reception and legacy
A website dedicated to both this film and its predecessor 1990: The Bronx Warriors was set up in 2004. The site contains two interviews with Enzo G Castellari and details an ongoing attempt to locate Mark Gregory (Trash) who vanished from public view in about 1989. There is also a message in MP3 format (in Italian) from Enzo and his son Andrea to Mark asking him to get in touch and saying how much they miss him.

The cult TV series Mystery Science Theater 3000 highlighted the movie in a seventh-season episode. Most of the jokes regarded the obvious Italian setting and bad outfits but of particular note is that the character of Doblòn (whose name the characters mispronounce as Toblerone) quickly won Mike, Tom Servo, and Crow over with his over the top performance ("We're getting a big slab of Toblerone here!"). They would groan over his absence in the middle of the movie ("If ever a scene cried out for Toblerone!") and cheered when he made his return later in the film ("Just drink him in!") MST3K riffers Michael J Nelson, Bill Corbett and Kevin Murphy produced a new riffing of the film for Rifftrax on June 3, 2022.

References

External links

MST3K treatment on ShoutFactoryTV

1983 films
1980s science fiction action films
1980s vigilante films
Italian science fiction action films
Italian sequel films
Films directed by Enzo G. Castellari
Dystopian films
1980s Italian-language films
Films scored by Francesco De Masi
Films set in the Bronx
Films set in the 1990s
Italian vigilante films
New Line Cinema films
1980s Italian films